Unihertz is a Chinese firm that makes unique smartphones and has its headquarters in Shanghai, China. The company makes niche mobile devices running Android OS, and developed its brand through Kickstarter platform. From 2017 to 2022, Unihertz has launched eight campaigns on Kickstarter and is supported by more than 30 thousand backers from across the world. The company's first release was the small-sized 4G smartphone named Jelly in 2017, which raised over 1.25 million dollars on the crowdfunding platform.

Company
Unihertz was founded as Unihertz E-Commerce Co., Ltd. in 2016, by Stephen Xu (CEO). Unihertz was granted a United States Patent and Trademark Office (USPTO) trademark on October 4, 2016, a European Union Intellectual Property Office (EUIPO) trademark on July 28, 2016, and a US patent on December 25, 2018.

Crowdfunding Smartphones
Unihertz gained attention in 2017 with the launch of a crowdfunding project for a tiny credit card sized Android smartphone named Unihertz Jelly, with the Kickstarter project achieving its goal of $30,000 in under an hour, reaching $1.25 million USD in the end. The next year's funds were raised for the Atom, a similarly tiny sized but rugged device. In 2019 Unihertz launched the Titan, which features a QWERTY keyboard.

Since then, Unihertz has launched several crowdfunding projects for its subsequent model including the Atom XL – DMR Walkie-Talkie rugged smartphone with a 4-inch display, the Jelly 2 – a full-featured mini phone with a 3-inch display, the Titan Pocket – a compact QWERTY keyboard smartphone, the TickTock, a unique-designed 5G rugged phone with dual-screen, and the Titan Slim, the latest QWERTY phone in 2022.

Other Smartphones 
Unihertz owns a self-operated smartphone manufacturing plant with a full production line to make unique smartphones for different types of people. It usually launches one or two new products on Kickstarter every year. Unihertz also releases and launches complementary products to its featured product series when it has sufficient funds. Among them, Unihertz Tank is a new breakthrough in rugged phone development. It is a 4G rugged smartphone with a 22,000mAh battery and equipped with a 108MP main camera. Its innovative 1200-lumen flashlight design in the back sparked a wide range of discussion on social media.

It is reported that Unihertz will release a new stylish smartphone called Luna at MWC 2023, as well as showcase its unique devices during the exhibition. Luna is expected to be another innovative device from Unihertz with a fresh design direction.

References

External links
 

Chinese brands
Mobile phone manufacturers
Mobile phone companies of China
Electronics companies of China
Companies based in Shanghai